Darlingtonea kentuckensis is a species of beetle in the family Carabidae, the only species in the genus Darlingtonea.

References

Trechinae